Thomas Johnes may refer to:
 Thomas Johnes (1748–1816),  Member of Parliament, landscape architect and social benefactor
 Thomas Johnes (priest) (1749–1826), Archdeacon of Barnstaple from 1807 to 1826
 Thomas Johnes (died 1780) (c. 1721–1780), Welsh politician
 Thomas Johnes (the elder) (died c. 1734), Welsh politician

See also
 Thomas Johns (disambiguation)